This article lists rivers which are (at least partially) located in Germany. Rivers that flow into the sea are sorted geographically, along the coast. Rivers that flow into other rivers are sorted by the proximity of their points of confluence to the sea (the lower in the list, the more upstream). Some rivers (the Meuse, for example) do not flow through Germany themselves, but they are mentioned for having German tributaries. They appear in italics. An alphabetical list of all German rivers that have an article in Wikipedia appears at the end of the article.

The rivers of Germany flow into the Baltic Sea, the Black Sea and the North Sea. The most important rivers of Germany include:
 flowing into the Baltic Sea: Oder
 flowing into the Black Sea: Danube (and its main tributaries Inn, Isar, and Lech)
 flowing into the North Sea: Rhine (and its main tributaries Moselle, Main and Neckar), Weser and Elbe (and its main tributaries Havel and Saale)

Draining into the Baltic Sea
The rivers in this section are sorted north-west (Danish border) to east (Polish border) and drain into the Baltic Sea:
Schwentine (in Kiel)
Trave (in Lübeck-Travemünde)
Stepenitz (near Travemünde)
Warnow (in Warnemünde) 
Nebel (in Bützow) 
Recknitz (in Ribnitz-Damgarten)
Peenestrom (in Peenemünde)
Peene (near Anklam)
Tollense (in Demmin)
branch of river Oder (from Oder Lagoon)
Świna/Swine (in Świnoujście, Poland)
Uecker (into Oder Lagoon in Ueckermünde)  
Oder (into Oder Lagoon near Szczecin, Poland) 
Lusatian Neisse (Lausitzer Neiße) (near Eisenhüttenstadt)

Draining into the Black Sea
These rivers drain into the Black Sea:
Danube (in Sulina, Romania) 
Inn (in Passau)
Rott (in Schärding)
Rott (in Rott am Inn)
Salzach (in Haiming)
Saalach (in Freilassing)
Alz (in Marktl)
Chiemsee (in Seebruck)
Tiroler Achen (in Grabenstätt)
Isen (in Neuötting)
Ilz (in Passau)
Vils (in Vilshofen)
Isar (near Deggendorf)
Amper/Ammer (near Moosburg)
Loisach (near Wolfratshausen)
Große Laber (near Straubing)
Regen (in Regensburg)
Chamb (in Cham)
Naab (near Regensburg)
Vils (in Kallmünz)
Schwarze Laber (in Sinzing)
Altmühl (in Kelheim)
Abens (near Neustadt (Donau))
Ilm (near Neustadt (Donau))
Paar (near Vohburg)
Friedberger Ach (near Oberhausen)
Lech (near Donauwörth)
Wertach (in Augsburg)
Schmutter (in Donauwörth)
Zusam (in Donauwörth)
Wörnitz (in Donauwörth)
Brenz (in Lauingen)
Mindel (near Günzburg)
Kammel (near Offingen)
Günz (in Günzburg)
Iller (in Ulm)
Rot (in Erbach an der Donau)
Riß (near Ehingen)
Lauchert (near Sigmaringen)

Draining into the North Sea
The rivers in this section are sorted south-west (Netherlands) to east (Danish border) and drain into the North Sea:
Maas (main branch at Stellendam, Netherlands)
Niers (in Gennep, Netherlands)
Rur/Roer (in Roermond, Netherlands)
Wurm (near Heinsberg)
Inde (in Jülich)
Rhine/Rhein (main branch at Hook of Holland, Netherlands)
Lippe (in Wesel)
Alme (in Paderborn)
Emscher (near Dinslaken)
Ruhr (in Duisburg)
Volme (near Hagen)
Lenne (near Hagen)
Möhne (in Neheim-Hüsten)
Erft (in Neuss)
Wupper/Wipper (in Leverkusen)
Sieg (in Bonn)
Agger (in Siegburg)
Nister (in Wissen)
Ahr (near Sinzig)
Wied (in Neuwied)
Moselle (in Koblenz)
Elzbach (in Moselkern)
Alf (in Alf) 
Lieser (near Bernkastel-Kues)
Salm (near Klüsserath)
Kyll (near Trier-Ehrang)
Saar (near Konz)
Nied (near Rehlingen-Siersburg)
Prims (in Dillingen)
Blies (in Sarreguemines)
Schwarzbach (near Zweibrücken)
Sauer (in Wasserbillig)
Prüm (near Echternach)
Nims (in Irrel)
Our (in Wallendorf)
Lahn (in Lahnstein)
Aar (in Diez)
Weil (in Weilburg)
Dill (in Wetzlar)
Ohm (in Cölbe)
Nahe (in Bingen)
Alsenz (near Bad Kreuznach)
Glan (near Bad Sobernheim)
Selz (in Ingelheim)
Main (in Mainz)
Nidda (in Frankfurt-Höchst)
Wetter (in Niddatal)
Kinzig (in Hanau)
Tauber (in Wertheim am Main)
Franconian Saale (in Gemünden am Main)
Regnitz (in Bamberg)
Pegnitz (in Fürth)
Rednitz (in Fürth)
Franconian Rezat (in Georgensgmünd)
Swabian Rezat (in Georgensgmünd)
Itz (in Baunach)
Red Main (near Kulmbach)
Neckar (in Mannheim)
Jagst (near Bad Friedrichshall) 
Kocher (in Bad Friedrichshall) 
Enz (in Besigheim)
Glems (near Markgröningen-Unterriexingen)
Murr (in Marbach am Neckar)
Rems (in Remseck)
Fils (in Plochingen)
Queich (near Germersheim)
Pfinz (near Germersheim)
Lauter (in Lauterbourg)
Murg (near Rastatt)
Sauer (in Seltz, France)
Acher (near Lichtenau)
Rench (near Lichtenau)
Kinzig (near Kehl)
Schutter (near Kehl)
Elz (near Lahr)
Wiese (near Basel)
Wutach (in Waldshut-Tiengen)
IJssel (into the IJsselmeer near Kampen, Netherlands) 
Berkel (in Zutphen, Netherlands) 
Oude IJssel/Issel (in Doesburg, Netherlands)
Zwarte Water (into the IJsselmeer near Genemuiden, Netherlands)
Vechte (near Zwolle, Netherlands)
Dinkel (in Neuenhaus)
Ems (near Delfzijl, Netherlands)
Hase (in Meppen)
Weser (near Bremerhaven) 
Hunte (in Elsfleth)
Lesum (in Bremen-Vegesack)
Wümme (in Ritterhude)
Aller (near Verden (Aller))
Böhme (near Rethem)
Leine (near Schwarmstedt)
Innerste (near Sarstedt)
Rhume (in Northeim)
Oder (Harz) (in Katlenburg-Lindau)
Örtze (in Winsen)
Fuhse (in Celle)
Oker (in Müden (Aller))
Schunter (near Braunschweig)
Werre (in Bad Oeynhausen)
Diemel (in Bad Karlshafen)
Fulda (in Hann. Münden)
Eder (in Edermünde)
Schwalm (near Fritzlar)
Haune (in Bad Hersfeld)
Werra (in Hannoversch Münden)
Hörsel (near Eisenach)
Ulster (in Philippsthal)
Elbe (near Cuxhaven) 
Oste (near Otterndorf)
Stör (near Glückstadt)
Alster (in Hamburg)
Bille (near Hamburg)
Ilmenau (near Winsen (Luhe))
Jeetzel (in Hitzacker)
Löcknitz (near Dömitz)
Elde (near Lenzen)
Aland (in Schnackenburg)
Stepenitz (in Wittenberge)
Havel (near Havelberg)
Dosse (near Havelberg)
Rhin (near Warnau)
Plane (near Brandenburg)
Nuthe (in Potsdam)
Spree (in Berlin-Spandau)
Dahme (in Berlin-Köpenick)
Ohre (near Burg)
Saale (in Barby)
Bode (in Nienburg (Saale))
Wipper (Saale) (near Bernburg)
White Elster (near Halle (Saale))
Parthe (in Leipzig)
Pleiße (in Leipzig)
Weida (near Gera)
Unstrut (near Naumburg)
Wipper (Unstrut) (near Heldrungen)
Gera (in Straußfurt)
Ilm (in Großheringen)
Schwarza (in Schwarza)
Mulde (in Dessau)
Zwickauer Mulde (near Colditz)
Chemnitz (near Wechselburg)
Freiberger Mulde (near Colditz)
Zschopau (near Döbeln)
Black Elster (near Wittenberg)
Weißeritz (in Dresden)
Wild Weißeritz (in Freital)
Wesenitz (in Pirna)
Ohře/Eger (in Litoměřice, Czech Republic)
Vltava (in Mělník, Czech Republic)
Berounka (near Prague, Czech Republic)
Mže/Mies (in Plzeň, Czech Republic)
Eider (in Tönning)
Treene (in Friedrichstadt)

Alphabetical list

A-E
Aabach, Aar, Abens, Acher, Agger, Ahr, Aland, Alf, Aller, Alme, Alsenz, Alster, Altmühl, Alz, Ammer (Neckar), Ammer/Amper, Aue (Elbe), Aue (Suhle), Berkel, Bever, Biber, Biela, Bille, Bist, Black Elster, Blau, Blies, Bode, Böhme, Breg, Breitach, Brend, Brenz, Brigach, Chamb, Chemnitz, Dahme, Danube, Diemel, Dill, Dinkel, Dosse, Dreisam, Düssel, Echaz, Eder, Eider, Elbe, Elde, Else, Elz (Neckar), Elz (Rhine), Elzbach, Ems, Emscher, Ennepe, Enz, Enz (Prüm), Erft

F-K
Feller Bach, Fils, Franconian Saale, Franconian Rezat, Franconian Saale, Freiberger Mulde, Friedberger Ach, Fuhse, Fulda, Garte, Gera, Glan, Gose/Abzucht, Gottleuba, Große Laber, Günz, Hamme, Hase, Haune, Havel, Heller, Hönne, Hörsel, Hunte, Ihme, Iller, Ilm (Bavaria), Ilm (Thuringia), Ilmenau, Ilz, Inde, Inn, Innerste, Isar, Isen, Itz, Jade, Jagst, Jeetzel, Kammel, Kander, Kinzig (Main), Kinzig (Rhine), Kocher, Kyll

L-O
Lahn, Lauchert, Lauter (Glan), Lauter (Rhine), Lech, Leda, Leibi, Leine, Lenne, Lesum, Lieser, Lippe, Löcknitz, Loisach, Lusatian Neisse, Lutter (Lachte), Lutter (Leine), Lutter (Oder), Main, Mandau, Maurine, Mindel, Möhne, Moselle, Mulde, Münstersche Aa, Murg, Murr, Mže/Mies, Naab, Nahe, Nebel, Neckar, Neetze, Nette (Innerste), Nette (Niers), Nette (Middle Rhine), Nidda, Nied, Niers, Nims, Nister, Nuthe, Oder, Oder (Harz), Ohm, Ohre, Ohře/Eger, Oker, Orla, Örtze, Oste, Oude IJssel, Our

P-S
Paar, Pader, Parthe, Peene, Pegnitz, Pfinz, Plane, Pleiße, Prims, Prüm, Queich, Recknitz, Red Main, Rednitz, Regen, Regnitz, Rems, Rench, Rheider Au, Rhin, Rhine, Rhume, Riß, Rot, Red Weißeritz, Red Main, Rott, another Rott, Ruhr, Rur, Ruwer, Ryck, Saalach, Saale, Saar, Salm, Salzach, Sauer, Sauer (Rhine), Scheppau, Schmutter, Schozach, Schwarze Elster, Schunter, Schutter, Swabian Rezat, Schwalm (Eder), Schwalm (Meuse), Schwarza, Schwarzbach (Blies), Schwarze Laber, Schwentine, Seeve, Selbitz, Selz, Sieg, Soeste, Spree, Sprotte, Stepenitz (Elbe), Stepenitz (Trave), Stör, Sulm, Swist

T-Z
Tanger, Tauber, Tiroler Achen, Tollense, Trave, Treene, Uecker, Ulster, Unstrut, Usa, Vechte, Vils (Danube), Vils (Lech), Vils (Naab), Volme, Wakenitz, Warnow, Weida, Weil, White Elster, Weißeritz, Werra, Werre, Wertach, Wesenitz, Weser, Westfälische Aa, Wetter, White Elster, White Main, Wied, Wiese, Wild Weißeritz, Wipper (Saale), Wipper (Unstrut), Wisper, Wörnitz, Wümme, Wupper, Würm, Wurm, Wutach, Zaber, Zeegenbach, Zschopau, Zusam, Zwickauer Mulde

By state
List of rivers of Baden-Württemberg
List of rivers of Bavaria
List of rivers of Brandenburg 
List of rivers of Berlin
List of rivers of Bremen
List of rivers of Hesse
List of rivers of Lower Saxony
List of rivers of Mecklenburg-Vorpommern
List of rivers of North Rhine-Westphalia
List of rivers of Rhineland-Palatinate
List of rivers of Saarland
List of rivers of Saxony 
List of rivers of Saxony-Anhalt
List of rivers of Schleswig-Holstein 
List of rivers of Thuringia